4544 Xanthus , provisional designation , is an asteroid, classified as near-Earth object of the Apollo group, approximately 1.3 kilometers in diameter. It was discovered on 31 March 1989, by astronomers Henry Holt and Norman Thomas at the Palomar Observatory in California.

References

External links 
 Benner, et al. - Radar Detection of Near-Earth Asteroids 2062 Aten, 2101 Adonis, 3103 Eger, 4544 Xanthus, and 1992 QN (1997)
 
 
 

004544
Discoveries by Henry E. Holt
Discoveries by Norman G. Thomas
Named minor planets
004544
19890331
20231021